Recreation Ground  is a cricket ground in Oudtshoorn, Western Cape, South Africa.  It is situated in the centre of the town, on Voortrekker Street. It is the headquarters of the South Western Districts Cricket Board.

The first recorded match on the ground was in 1889, when South Western Districts hosted the touring R. G. Warton's XI from England. It has served as South Western Districts' main home ground since then, and has hosted first-class matches regularly from the 2006–07 season. The ground also hosted matches in the 2016 Africa T20 Cup, including the semi-finals and final.

References

External links
 Recreation Ground, Oudtshoorn at CricketArchive
 Cricinfo

Cricket grounds in South Africa
Sports venues in the Western Cape
1889 establishments in the Cape Colony
Sports venues completed in 1889
19th-century architecture in South Africa